Hugo Wilhelm Traugott Erdmann (8 May 1862 – 25 June 1910) was the German chemist who discovered, together with his doctoral advisor Jacob Volhard, the Volhard-Erdmann cyclization.

Erdmann invented the name Thiozone in 1908, hypothesizing that S3 made up a large proportion of liquid sulfur.

In collaboration with Rudolph Fittig, Erdmann found that dehydration of γ-phenyl structural analog of isocrotonic acid produced α-naphthol, an observation that provided evidence in understanding the nature of naphthalene.

Bibliography
Books written by Erdmann:

See also
 German inventors and discoverers

References

Notes

1862 births
1910 deaths
People from Pasłęk
People from East Prussia
19th-century German chemists
20th-century German chemists
Academic staff of the Technical University of Berlin